Garra nethravathiensis is a species of cyprinid fish in the genus Garra which is found in the Netravati River, Karnataka India.

References 

Garra
Fish described in 2014